"If I Were You" is a song written by k.d. lang and Ben Mink and performed by lang. It was the first single released from lang's third studio album, All You Can Eat (1995), on 18 September 1995. The single reached number 24 on the Canadian RPM Top Singles chart and number four on the RPM Adult Contemporary chart. On the US Billboard charts, the single reached number 15 on the Bubbling Under Hot 100 and was lang's second and final number one on the Hot Dance Club Play chart. Overseas, "If I Were You" peaked at number 23 in Australia, number 50 in New Zealand, and number 53 in the United Kingdom.

Critical reception
In his review of All You Can Eat, Steve Baltin from Cash Box wrote, "The disc kicks off with the erudite 'If I Were You', a song that more adventurous radio programmers will find friendly." Billboard named it k.d. lang's sixth-best song.

Track listings

 US 7-inch and CD single
 "If I Were You" – 3:38
 "Get Some" – 3:37

 US 12-inch single
A1. "If I Were You" (main mix) – 6:11
A2. "If I Were You" (Junior's X-Beat mix) – 7:28
A3. "Get Some" – 3:37
B1. "If I Were You" (Junior's X-Beat Miss Queen dub) – 9:27
B2. "If I Were You" (main mix dub) – 11:04

 US maxi-CD single
 "If I Were You" (album edit) – 3:38
 "If I Were You" (Smokin' Lounge mix) – 4:10
 "If I Were You" (main mix) – 5:59
 "If I Were You" (Junior's X-Beat mix) – 7:28
 "Get Some" – 3:37

 UK, Australian, and Japanese CD single
 "If I Were You" – 3:58
 "Get Some" – 3:37
 "What's New Pussycat" (live) – 2:44

 UK cassette single
 "If I Were You" – 3:58
 "What's New Pussycat" (live) – 2:44

 Australian maxi-CD single
 "If I Were You" (album version)
 "If I Were You" (Close to the Groove edit)
 "If I Were You" (Smokin' Lounge mix)
 "If I Were You" (Junior's X-Beat mix)
 "If I Were You" (album edit)
 "What's New Pussycat" (live)

Charts

Weekly charts

Year-end charts

Release history

See also
 List of number-one dance singles of 1996 (U.S.)

References

1995 singles
1995 songs
K.d. lang songs
Music videos directed by Kevin Kerslake
Songs written by Ben Mink
Songs written by k.d. lang